Uti Nwachukwu (born 3 August 1982) is a style icon, TV personality, actor and the co-host of the Nigerian show Jara. He is a native of Ndokwa, Aboh Kingdom, Ndokwa East Local Government Area, Delta State, Nigeria.

Early life 
Uti is the last of a family of six—there are four other kids. He was raised in Delta state's Ughelli on Uloho Avenue. From 1993 until 1999, he attended classes at the Igbenedion Education Center. His education in computer science includes a diploma from the University of Nigeria in Nsukka and a bachelor's degree from Benson Idahosa University in Benin City.

Career 
Uti is the 40-year-old representative from Nigeria in Big Brother Africa 3. He became the third evictee of Big Brother Africa 3 house on 5 October 2008 (Day 42). During his stay Uti was known for often teasing his fellow housemates (mostly Mimi and Thami). During Namibian housemate Lucille's eviction Uti had a violent out burst upon learning that she had been evicted.

In 2010 Uti competed as a contestant in Big Brother Africa 5: All-Stars in which he lasted 91 days and ultimately won by defeating Munya Chidzonga in a final vote of 8 to 7. He has spent a combined total of 133 days in the Big Brother house.

He has been a popular red carpet and TV program host. A few famous hosting gigs include the red carpet of the biggest awards event in Africa, The Africa Magic Viewers Choice Awards, for seven years and counting, as well as the popular magazine show Jara, which lasted for 11 seasons on Africa Magic. In 2022, he hosted  the red carpet of the eighth edition of  Africa Magic Viewers Choice Awards (AMVCA),  the reunion of Showmax hit reality TV show "The RealHousewives of Lagos" and the launching event of Tecno Camon 19.

Acting career 
In 2011, Uti made the transition from singing to acting, appearing in a number of Nollywood films, including The Changer, Finding Mercy, Nnenda, In the Cupboard, Broken Silence, Weekend Getaway, and Deep Inside. He recorded and released his debut single, Once in my life, in the beginning of 2011. The song's music video was recorded in May 2011 and premiered in the summer of the same year to acclaim from music enthusiasts across the continent.

Filmography 

 The Changer
 Finding Mercy
 Bursting Out (film)
 Nnenda
 In the Cupboard
 Broken Silence
 Weekend Getaway
 Deep Inside
 Whose Meal Ticket
 Aki and Pawpaw
 Love Is in the Hair
 Chief Daddy
 10 Days in Sun City

Awards 

2012 GIAMA "Best New Actor" held in the US.
2012 Mode Men Awards "TV personality of the Year"
Won the Best Soft Rock/ Alternative Video at the Nigerian Music Awards in November 2021
Nollywood movie Award for the best rising star(male)
African Movie academy awards for the best supporting role in 2016
Nigerian Broadcaster award for African broadcaster 2014 and 2016
Nollywood Movie Award for Best Rising Star (Male)

See also
 List of Igbo people
 List of Nigerian media personalities

References

External links
 http://thenetng.com/tag/uti-nwachukwu/
 http://pmnewsnigeria.com/2012/11/16/when-uti-nwachukwu-doted-on-beverly-naya/
 http://www.bellanaija.com/tag/uti-nwachukwu/

1982 births
Living people
Nigerian television personalities
Male actors from Delta State
21st-century Nigerian male actors
Igbo actors
Nigerian male television actors
Nigerian television presenters
University of Nigeria alumni
Nigerian media personalities
Nigerian entertainment industry businesspeople
Nigerian fashion businesspeople
Reality show winners
Big Brother (franchise) winners